Kevin Daniel Van Den Kerkhof (born 14 March 1996) is an Algerian professional footballer who plays as a right-back for  club Bastia.

Career
A youth product of Valenciennes, Van Den Kerkhof began his footballing career with Aulnoye in 2014, before moving to the reserves of Lorient in 2015. After a big injury he returned to Feignies Aulnoye, before moving to Belgium with La Louvière in 2017. In 2019, he moved to the Belgian National Division 1 club Olympic Charleroi. After one season there, he transferred to the Luxembourgian club F91 Dudelange, where he scored 17 goals and had 13 assist in two seasons. On 12 May 2022, he returned to France with Ligue 2 club Bastia. He made his professional debut in a 2–0 Ligue 2 loss to Laval on 30 July 2022.

Personal life
Born in France, Van Den Kerkhof is of mixed French and Algerian descent and was called up to the Algerian squad for the first time in March 2023 for 2 AFCON qualifiers against Niger. He is a close friend of the French international footballer Benjamin Pavard, having been born a couple of weeks before in the same small town, Maubeuge.

References

External links
 
 

1996 births
Living people
People from Maubeuge
Sportspeople from Nord (French department)
French sportspeople of Algerian descent
French footballers
Footballers from Hauts-de-France
Association football fullbacks
Ligue 2 players
Championnat National 2 players
Championnat National 3 players
Belgian National Division 1 players
Luxembourg National Division players
Valenciennes FC players
Entente Feignies Aulnoye FC players
R.A.A. Louviéroise players
R. Olympic Charleroi Châtelet Farciennes players
F91 Dudelange players
SC Bastia players
French expatriate footballers
French expatriate sportspeople in Belgium
Expatriate footballers in Belgium
French expatriate sportspeople in Luxembourg
Expatriate footballers in Luxembourg